John Hanbury (6 August 1744 – 6 April 1784) was a British heir and politician who sat in the House of Commons from 1766 to 1784.

Early life
John Hanbury was born in 1744. His father, Capel Hanbury served as the Member of Parliament for Leominster. His mother was Jane Tracy. His paternal grandfather was John Hanbury, while his maternal grandfather was Thomas Tracy, 5th Viscount Tracy. His great grandfather, Capel Hanbury (1625–1704), began the building of Pontypool Park House in 1659, where he grew up at Pontypool Park in Wales. 

His family was responsible for the industrialisation and urbanisation of the eastern valley through which runs the Afon Llwyd (in English "grey river") in Monmouthshire around Pontypool.

Career
Hanbury was MP for Monmouthshire from 1765 until 1785, before a writ was issued for a by-election.

Personal life and death

Hanbury lived in the manor-house of Hoarstone in Pontypool Park (which now houses St. Alban's R.C. High School and Pontypool Museum). He also built the Shell Grotto, Pontypool and Folly Tower above Pontypool Park. With his wife, he had issue:
 John Capel Hanbury
 Capel Hanbury - later he took the name of Hanbury-Leigh
 Charles Hanbury-Tracy was created Baron Sudeley.

Hanbury died in 1784, aged 39.

References

External links 
Welsh Biography Online

1744 births
1784 deaths
18th-century Welsh businesspeople
British ironmasters
Members of the Parliament of Great Britain for Welsh constituencies
British MPs 1761–1768
British MPs 1768–1774
British MPs 1774–1780
British MPs 1780–1784
British MPs 1784–1790